Clarence Josef McLin Jr. (May 31, 1921 – December 28, 1988) was an American mortician and politician who served as a member of the Ohio House of Representatives for the 36th district from 1967 to 1988. His father was civil rights leader Mac McLin.

Early life 
McLin was born in East St. Louis, Illinois and moved with his family to Dayton, Ohio in 1931, where he attended Dunbar High School and worked at the family business, the McLin Funeral Home. As a youth, McLin filed a civil rights lawsuit against McCrory's, a dime store at Fourth and Main streets in Dayton, for the store's refusal to serve him because of his race.

Career 
McLin was elected to the Ohio House of Representatives in 1966 and assumed office in 1967. During his 22-year-long tenure, McLin became known as a powerful member of the House. He was also a close ally of Speaker Vern Riffe.

McLin was sworn in a twelfth term in 1988, but died a few days later. He was the longest-serving black legislator in Ohio history at the time of his death. His daughter, Rhine McLin was appointed to fill his seat.

Personal life 
He was the father of Candace Smith, an attorney, actress, model, and Miss Ohio (2003). The US 35 expressway in west Dayton, which was completed in October 1996, is designated the C. J. McLin Jr. Parkway in honor of McLin's longtime advocacy for and work toward the construction of such a highway.

References

External links

1921 births
1988 deaths
African-American state legislators in Ohio
Burials at Woodland Cemetery and Arboretum
Democratic Party members of the Ohio House of Representatives
Politicians from Dayton, Ohio
20th-century American politicians
African-American people in Ohio politics
20th-century African-American politicians
People from East St. Louis, Illinois